Nicolò D'Amico (1953-2020), also known as Nichi D’Amico, was an astronomer and President of Istituto Nazionale di Astrofisica.

Personal life 
He was born on 28 June 1953 in Palermo. He was married and had a daughter. He died on 15 September 2020 in Cagliari.

Career 
He was a professor of astrophysics at the University of Cagliari, and the director of the Cagliari Observatory and the Sardinia Radio Telescope. He was the president of Istituto Nazionale di Astrofisica since 16 October 2015, with a second 4-year term confirmed on 30 December 2019.

References 

20th-century Italian astronomers
1953 births
2020 deaths
Scientists from Palermo
Academic staff of the University of Cagliari
Italian astrophysicists
21st-century Italian astronomers